Kyzyl-Kyya (Kyzyl-Kiya) is a city in Batken Region, in southwestern Kyrgyzstan. It is a city of regional significance, not part of a district, and consists of the town proper and the villages Karavan, Ak-Bulak and Jin-Jigen. It is situated on the southern edge of the Fergana Valley, 32 km southeast of Fergana, and 65 km southwest of Osh. The town is one of the oldest centers of the coal mining industry in Kyrgyzstan.

Population

Geography

Climate 
Kyzyl-Kyya has a cold semi-arid climate (Köppen climate classification BSk). The average annual temperature is 11.7 °C (53.1 °F). The warmest month is July with an average temperature of 24.7 °C (76.5 °F) and the coolest month is January with an average temperature of -3.4 °C (25.9 °F). The average annual precipitation is 295.8mm (11.64") and has an average of 68.6 days with precipitation. The wettest month is March with an average of 44.9mm (1.8") of precipitation and the driest month is August with an average of 4.1mm (0.2") of precipitation.

References

External links
Портале Кызыл-Кийского Землячества 
Баткенская область 
WELCOME TO THE CITY OF KYZYL KIA

Populated places in Batken Region